Santa Hunters is a 2014 made-for-television film created for Nickelodeon. It was directed by Savage Steve Holland, based on a script written by Jamie Nash and produced by Amy Sydorick. The film stars Benjamin Flores Jr., Breanna Yde, Laya DeLeon Hayes, and Mace Coronel as a group of children trying to find evidence to prove the existence of Santa Claus.

Plot summary 
All Alex wants to do is prove to the world that Santa exists. He has managed to convince his sister Elizabeth and their cousins Zoey and Richard to setting up cameras throughout their house to capture footage of Santa. Their attempt is successful, but to their horror, they discover that Santa loses a bit of his magic every time he's seen. As Christmas starts to vanish before their eyes, it's up to the children to find and destroy the evidence of Santa. However, they must first contend with their Uncle Charlie's girlfriend Natasha, who is determined to sell the footage of Santa for her own selfish gains.

Cast 
Benjamin Flores Jr. as Alex
Breanna Yde as Zoey
Mace Coronel as Richard
Laya DeLeon Hayes as Elizabeth
Donavon Stinson as Santa
April Telek as Natasha
Kelly Perine as Uncle Charlie
Brenda Crichlow (credited as Brenda M. Chrichlow) as Mom
Viv Leacock as Dad 
BJ Harrison as Grandma 
Alvin Sanders as Grandpa
Serge Houde as Principal Welch
Sewit Haile as Leader Girl
Eric Fell as Cop
Rachel Prosch as Tweener Girl
Bill Kurtis as Santa Hunters V.O. Narrator (voice)

Production
TBA

Reception 
Commonsensemedia gave the film two stars, as they felt that it was "a fairly mundane addition to a holiday movie repertoire packed with classics and traditional favorites." Media Life Magazine panned Santa Hunters, criticizing it for its focus on commercialism, stating that "The show’s writer, Jamie Nash, and director, Savage Steve Holland, must never have read or seen “How the Grinch Stole Christmas,” because then they would know that Christmas isn’t just about getting presents and that it means a little bit more."

In contrast, the New York Times gave a more favorable opinion of the movie.

Awards 
 Leo Award for Best Youth or Children's Program or Series (2015, won)

References

External links
 

2014 television films
2014 films
English-language Canadian films
2010s Christmas films
American Christmas films
Nickelodeon original films
Films shot in Vancouver
American fantasy films
Canadian Christmas films
Canadian fantasy films
Canadian television films
Films directed by Savage Steve Holland
2010s Canadian films
2010s American films
Santa Claus in film